Awa Ly (born 4 January 1977 in Paris, France) is a French singer, songwriter, and actress of Senegalese origin who lives in Rome, Italy. She has released three studio albums, Modulated (2009), Five and a Feather (2016), and Safe and Sound (2020). As an actress, she played in several movies, including Black and White (2008), La nostra vita (2010), and Escort in Love (2011).

Biography
Awa Ly was born and raised in Paris. Her parents are from Senegal and most of her family lives in Dakar. She currently lives in Rome and works as an actress, singer and songwriter.

Ly's debut studio album, Modulated, was released in 2009.

In 2011, Ly played in the Italian film Escort in Love by Daniele Luchetti besides Paola Cortellesi, Raoul Bova and Rocco Papaleo.

She accompanied Pino Daniele in summer 2013 on an international tour after having already performed with him in the United States and Canada.

Ly has previously used My Major Company, a fan-funded music label in France, and for finishing her five-track EP, which was recorded at Funkhaus in Berlin in December 2013, she was seeking funding via the French crowdfunding platform KissKissBankBank. The self-titled EP was released in 2014.

On March 25, 2016, Ly released her second full-length studio album, Five and a Feather.

On March 20, 2020, Ly released her third studio album, Safe and Sound.

Filmography
Black and White (2008)
The Front Line (2009)
La nostra vita (2010)
20 sigarette (2010)
Escort in Love (2011)
Scappo a casa (2019)
The Time of Indifference (2020)

Discography

Studio albums
 2009: Modulated
 2016: Five and a Feather
 2020: Safe and Sound

EPs
 2011: Parole Prestate
 2014: Awa Ly

Singles
 2015: "Let Me Love You"
 2019: "Close Your Eyes"
 2020: "Mesmerizing"

References

External links
 Official website
 Official page on Facebook
 Official page on Twitter
 

Living people
1977 births
French film actresses
21st-century French singers
21st-century French women singers